Favières is the name of four communes in France:

 Favières, Eure-et-Loir
 Favières, Meurthe-et-Moselle
 Favières, Seine-et-Marne
 Favières, Somme